This is a list of members of parliament (MPs) elected to the Parliament of Ghana for the Second Parliament of the Fourth Republic of Ghana at the 1996 parliamentary election, held on 7 December 1996.

The list is arranged by region and constituencies. New MPs elected since the general election and changes in party allegiance are noted at the bottom of the page.

Composition

List of MPs elected in the general election
The following table is a list of MPs elected on 7 December 1996, ordered by region and constituency. The previous MP and previous party column shows the MP and party holding the seat.



Ghana Parliament Regional Maps 1996

Ashanti Region

https://datawrapper.dwcdn.net/scTRg/3/

Greater Accra Region

https://datawrapper.dwcdn.net/iuhus/1/

Brong Ahafo Region

https://datawrapper.dwcdn.net/Hxx5g/2/

Central Region

https://datawrapper.dwcdn.net/Wi7Tn/3/

Eastern Region

https://datawrapper.dwcdn.net/Wi7Tn/3/

By-elections
Ablekuma Central constituency – 26 March 1999 – Victor Okuley Nortey (NPP) won the by-election with a majority of 4,808.
 Lambussie constituency – 26 May 1999 – Following the death of Luke Koo the then MP of the Lambussie constituency, a by-election was held on 26 May 1999 – Alice Teni Boon (NDC) won the seat with a majority of 4,488.

Notes and references

See also
1996 Ghanaian parliamentary election
Parliament of Ghana
Daniel Francis Annan – Speaker of the Second Parliament

External links and sources
1996 Parliamentary elections results
Election Passport:Ghana – Data
African Elections Database
1996 parliamentary election winners list
Members of the 4th Republic Parliament as of October 1999

1996